Henry Cole (1808–1882) was an English civil servant and inventor.

Henry Cole may also refer to:

Henry Cole (priest) (c. 1500–1579/80), English Roman Catholic churchman and academic
Henry Cole (minister) (1792–1858), Anglican curate
Henry Cole (Conservative politician) (1809–1890), British politician, cricketer and army officer
Henry A. Cole (1838–1909), American cavalry colonel of the American Civil War
Henry Thomas Cole (1874–1880), British Member of Parliament for Penryn and Falmouth
Henry Cole (illustrator) (born 1955), American author and illustrator of children's books
Henry Cole (basketball), American basketball player and coach
Henry Cole (presenter) British TV presenter, director and producer

See also
Harry Cole (disambiguation)